Surviving Disaster is a 2006 BBC, Discovery Channel, and ProSieben co-production documentary-drama series about disasters in the 20th century, starring people who survived them. It was produced in association with France 5.

It is narrated by Bernard Hill.

Episodes
 "Munich Air Crash" – 1958 Munich air disaster
 "Eruption at Mount St. Helens" – 1980 eruption of Mount St. Helens
 "Chernobyl Nuclear Disaster" – 1986 Chernobyl disaster (This episode is commonly referred to as "BBC's Chernobyl" in discussion, to compare and differentiate it from HBO's Chernobyl, which it is frequently compared to)
 "San Francisco Earthquake" – 1989 Loma Prieta earthquake
 "Fastnet Yacht Race" – 1979 Fastnet race
 "Iran Hostage Rescue" – 1979–1981 Iran hostage crisis
 "The Sinking of the Estonia" – 1994 sinking of the Estonia

References

External links
 

2000s British television series
BBC television documentaries
Documentary films about disasters
Science docudramas